Telmin may refer to :

 an oasis in present Tunisia, the site of Ancient Tamalluma, a former city in the Roman province of Byzacena, now a Latin Catholic titular bishopric
 Mebendazole (MBZ), a medication to treat a number of parasitic worm infestations